Charles Rose (born 1960 in New York City) is an American architect.

Early and personal life

Rose is one of five children raised by  Waldorf schoolteachers in Garden City, Long Island.  He attended the Waldorf School of Garden City from K-12 and pursued study of piano in New York at the Manhattan School of Music prior to college.  He enrolled at Princeton University as a scholarship student and physics major but soon switched to architecture.  He has lived in Boston since attending the Graduate School of Design at Harvard University.

Works
Rose earned degrees in architecture at Princeton University and Harvard's Graduate School of Design, studying under Michael Graves and Rafael Moneo. After Harvard, Rose worked with landscape architect Michael Van Valkenburgh, an experience that influenced his design philosophy of architecture that "sees the site." He established his practice in Boston in 1989 and in two decades completed more than 50 buildings. His architecture, influenced by his work with Valkenburgh, is formally conscious of site and the buildings relationship to it. Two early projects that established Rose's reputation for buildings that "see the site" are the Leeper Studio Complex at the Atlantic Center for the Arts in New Smyrna Beach, Fla. (1997), and Camp Paint Rock (2000) in Hyattville, Wyo. The Atlantic Center for the Arts is in the rainforest-like environment of Florida's East Coast and uses boardwalks to connect the buildings with meandering paths. Camp Paint Rock on the other hand, uses elevated paths to connect the buildings along the canyon of northern Wyoming. Rose's buildings in both settings have been described as being knit into the landscape (rather than objects on the land). The forms he creates "resonate with features of the site and mediate the site's demands", such as climate and orientation toward the sun. After completing Camp Paint Rock, for underprivileged Los Angeles teens, Rose received several commissions: including a commercial project in 1997 for Gemini Consulting to design an "office of the future"  which was noted by an award from Architectural Record; Gulf Coast Museum of Art (Largo, Fl., 2001); the United States Port of Entry in Del Rio, Texas, and the Currier Center for the Performing Arts at The Putney School (Putney, Vt., 2004).

Buildings for academic, cultural and non-profit institutions are the mainstays of Rose's practice, along with private homes that have been described as warm, modernist spaces that are "sculptural and lyrical." Orleans House and the  New York penthouse Rose completed in 2010 for violinist Joshua Bell are two examples. Rose also completed several large-scale institutional projects in 2010: the Carl and Ruth Shapiro Admissions Center at Brandeis University in Waltham, Ma. (a second project for Brandeis, after the 65,000 square foot Carl and Ruth Shapiro Campus Center, which opened in 2002) and the Jean Vollum Drawing, Painting, and Photography Building at Oregon College of Art and Craft in Portland.  The firm has worked in energy-efficient design with two significant federal and state commissions: a zero-net-energy consumption transit center for the state of Massachusetts and a 60,000-square-foot office building in Portsmouth, NH.  This project was commissioned by the U.S. General Services Administration's "Design Excellence Program".

Rose has also taught in the architecture programs at many universities, including the Massachusetts Institute of Technology, the University of Virginia, and Harvard and Rice universities. Rose also designs furniture; his Executive Mother and Child Desk was featured in Dwell magazine in 2006

Carbon-neutral or zero net energy consumption design
Rose's designs incorporate energy-efficient features, such as geothermal, planted roofs, and louver systems that increase natural lighting.  Its most energy-efficient building – a brick-and-copper-clad 25,000-square-foot transit center in Greenfield, Ma. – is designed to produce as much energy as it uses by drawing on geothermal sources, a wood-chip boiler and photovoltaic array. The project, funded in part by the American Recovery and Reinvestment Act, is the state's first zero-net-energy transit center and will serve as an office, bus station, and train depot on the upgraded "Knowledge Corridor" rail line that goes from Connecticut through Massachusetts to Vermont.

Selected works

 Leeper Studio Complex at the Atlantic Center for the Arts (New Smyrna Beach, Florida, 1997)
 Carl and Ruth Shapiro Admissions Center at Brandeis University (Waltham, Massachusetts, 2009)
 Bartholomew County Veterans Memorial (Columbus, Indiana, 1996)
 Beacom School of Business at The University of South Dakota (Vermillion, South Dakota, 2009)
 Camp Paint Rock (Hyattville, Wyoming, 2000)
 Carl and Ruth Shapiro Campus Center at Brandeis University(Waltham, Massachusetts, 2002)
 Chilmark Residence (Chilmark, Massachusetts, 2001)
 Executive Mother and Child Desk (2006)
 Franklin Regional Transit Center (Greenfield, Massachusetts, 2011)
 Gemini Consulting Global Offices (Cambridge, Massachusetts, 1997)
 Joshua Bell Loft (New York, New York, 2010)
 Orleans House (Orleans, Massachusetts, 2006)
 Theodore R. and Karen K. Muenster University Center at The University of South Dakota (Vermillion, South Dakota, 2009)

Gallery

Awards
As design principal of Boston-based Charles Rose Architects, Inc., Rose is the winner of awards from the American Institute of Architects and national competitions .  In 1995, he won the competition for the Bartholomew County Veterans Memorial in Columbus, Indiana, in 2000, he won for the Beacom School of Business at The University of South Dakota in Vermillion, a contest that led to a commission to design the school's Theodore R. and Karen K. Muenster University Center,. In 2012 construction was completed on the  John Olver Transit Center in Greenfield, MA. The project was commissioned by the Federal Transit Administration and has won awards, including Boston Society of Architects Design Award and the ACEC 2013 Gold Award

 AIA New England Honor Award for Design Excellence for the New Shrub and Vine Collection of Arnold Arboretum, Harvard University (2010)
 American Architecture Award from the Chicago Athenaeum for the Orleans House, Orleans, MA (2007)
 AIA New England Award for Design Excellence for the Currier Center for the Performing Arts, Putney, VT (2005)
 Design Excellence Award from the U.S. General Services Administration for the United States Port of Entry, Del Rio, Texas (2004)
 American Architecture Award from the Chicago Athenaeum for the Carl and Ruth Shapiro Campus Center at Brandeis University, Waltham, MA (2004)
 American Architecture Award from the Chicago Athenaeum for Camp Paint Rock, Hyattville, Wyoming (2002)
 American Institute of Architects Connecticut Design Award for The Foote School, New Haven, CT (2002)
 American Institute of Architects New England Award for Design Excellence for Camp Paint Rock, Hyattville, Wyoming (2002)
 American Institute of Architects New England Award for Design Excellence for Chilmark House, Martha's Vineyard, MA (2002)
  American Institute of Architects New England Award for Design Excellence for Amphitheater and Bathhouse, Acton, MA (2002)
 American Wood Council National Honor Award for Camp Paint Rock, Hyattville, Wyoming (2002)
 I.D. Design Award for Camp Paint Rock, Hyattville, Wyoming (2002)
 American Institute of Architects New England Award for Design Excellence for Equipment Shed, San Juan Island, Washington (2002)
 American Institute of Architects New England Award for Design Excellence for the Gulf Coast Museum of Art, The Florida Botanical Gardens, Largo, FL (2001) 
 American Institute of Architects Young Architect Citation (1998)
 American Institute of Architects New England Award for Design Excellence for the Atlantic Center for the Arts, New Smyrna Beach, Florida (1998)
 Tucker Award of Excellence from the Building Stone Institute for the Bartholomew County Veterans Memorial, Columbus, Indiana (1998)
 American Wood Council National Honor Award for Equipment Shed, San Juan Island, Washington (1997)
 AIA: Business Week/Architectural Record Business Design Award for Gemini Consulting Global Offices, Cambridge, MA (1997)
 I.D. Magazine Annual Design Review, Design Distinction Award for the Atlantic Center for the Arts, New Smyrna Beach, Florida (1997)
 American Wood Council National Honor Award for the Atlantic Center for the Arts, New Smyrna Beach, Florida (1995)

References 

1960 births
Living people
Architects from New York City
Harvard Graduate School of Design alumni
Princeton University School of Architecture alumni